The 2013 Kentucky Wildcats baseball team represented the University of Kentucky in the 2013 NCAA Division I baseball season.  The Wildcats played their home games in Cliff Hagan Stadium. The team was coached by Gary Henderson, who was in his fifth season at Kentucky.

Personnel

Roster

Schedule

! style="background:#273BE2;color:white;"| Regular Season
|- valign="top" 

|- bgcolor="#ccffcc"
| 1 || February 15 || @ || Russell C. King Field || 9-2 || Reed (1–0) || Roland (0–1) || none ||  || 1–0 || –
|- bgcolor="#ccffcc"
| 2 || February 17 ||  || Russell C. King Field || 20-3 || Grundy (2–0) || Kasper (0–1) || none || || 2–0 ||–
|- bgcolor="#ccffcc"
| 3 || February 18 ||  || Cleveland S. Harley Baseball Park || 11-10 || Gott (1–0) || Jeanot (0–1) || none || 318 || 3–0 || –
|- align="center" bgcolor="#ffbbb"
| 4 || February 21 ||  || Pelicans Ballpark || 5-7 || MaVorhis (1–0) || Reed (1–1) || none ||  || 3–1 ||–
|- bgcolor="#ccffcc"
| 5 || February 22 ||  || Pelicans Ballpark || 6-1 || Grundy (2-0) || Clark (1-1) || none ||  || 4–1 ||–
|- bgcolor="#ccffcc"
| 6 || February 24 ||  || Charles Watson Stadium || 8-2 || Gott (2-0) || Connolly (0-1) || none || 854 || 5–1 ||–
|- bgcolor="#ccffcc"
| 7 || February 26 ||  || Cliff Hagan Stadium || 11-5 || Shepherd (1-0) || Vonder Haar (1-1) || none || 1,416 || 6–1 ||–
|- bgcolor="#ccffcc"
| 8 || February 27 ||  || Cliff Hagan Stadium || 6-2 || Wijas (1-0) || Westrick (0-1) || Gott (1) || 1,447 || 7–1 ||–
|-

|- bgcolor="#ccffcc"
| 9 || March 1 ||  || Cliff Hagan Stadium || 21-2 || Reed (2-1) || Pusateri (0-3) || none || 1,435 || 8–1 ||–
|- bgcolor="#ccffcc"
| 10 || March 2 || Akron || Cliff Hagan Stadium || 7-0 || Grundy (3-0) || Valek (0-2) || none || 1,472 || 9–1 ||–
|- bgcolor="#ccffcc"
| 11 || March 3 || Akron || Cliff Hagan Stadium || 9-2 || Littrell (1-0) || Brubaker (0-3) || none || 1,456 || 10–1 ||–
|- bgcolor="#ccffcc"
| 12 || March 6 ||  || Cliff Hagan Stadium || 6-3 || Cody (1-0) || Klever (1-1) || Gott (2) || 1,394 || 11–1 ||–
|- bgcolor="#ccffcc"
| 13 || March 8 ||  || Cliff Hagan Stadium || 2-1 || Dwyer (1-0) || Misiewicz (1-1) || Gott (3) || 1,624 || 12–1 ||–
|- align="center" bgcolor="#ffbbb"
| 14 || March 9 || Michigan State || Cliff Hagan Stadium || 1-6 || Garner (2-1) || Grundy (3-1) || none || 1,830 || 12–2 ||–
|- bgcolor="#ccffcc"
| 15 || March 10 || Michigan State || Cliff Hagan Stadium || 3-1 || Littrell (2-0) || VanVossen (0-1) || Gott (4) || 1,815 || 13–2 ||–
|- bgcolor="#ccffcc"
| 16 || March 12 || || Cliff Hagan Stadium || 6-3 || Strecker (1-0) || Kennedy (2-1) || Gott(5) || 1,487 || 14–2 ||–
|- align="center" bgcolor="#ffbbb"
| 17 || March 15 || @Florida || Alfred A. McKethan Stadium || 1-4 || Harris (3-1) || Reed (2-2) || Magliozzi (4) || 3,540 || 14–3 || 0–1
|- bgcolor="#ccffcc"
| 18 || March 16 || Florida  || Alfred A. McKethan Stadium || 11-5 || Grundy (4-1) || Crawford (0-3) || Gott (6) || 3,120 || 15–3 || 1–1
|- bgcolor="#ccffcc"
| 19 || March 17 || Florida  || Alfred A. McKethan Stadium || 6-2 || Littrell (3-0) || Hanhold (0-2) || none || 3,284 || 16–3 || 2–1
|- align="center" bgcolor="#ffbbb"
| 20 || March 19 ||  || Cliff Hagan Stadium || 3-6 || Bartley (1-0) || Cody (1-1) || Taylor (3) || 1,616 || 16–4 || 2–1
|- align="center" bgcolor="#ffbbb"
| 21 || March 22 || Mississippi State || Cliff Hagan Stadium || 4-8 || Mitchell (5-0) || Reed (2-3) || none || 1,788 || 16–5 || 2–2
|- bgcolor="#ccffcc"
| 22 || March 23 || Mississippi State || Cliff Hagan Stadium || 4-3 || Wijas (2-0) || Girodo (2-1) || none || 2,284 || 17–5 || 3–2
|- bgcolor="#ccffcc"
| 23 || March 23 || Mississippi State || Cliff Hagan Stadium || 3-2 || Grundy (5-1) || Graveman (2-2) || Gott (7) ||  || 18–5 || 4–2
|- bgcolor="#ccffcc"
| 24 || March 27 ||  || Cliff Hagan Stadium || 8-2 || Cody (2-0) || Margaritonda (0-4) || none || 1,482 || 19–5 || 4–2
|- bgcolor="#ccffcc"
| 25 || March 29 ||  || Cliff Hagan Stadium || 3-210 || Gott (3-0) || Walsh (1-3) || none || 2,069 || 20–5 || 5–2
|- align="center"  bgcolor="#ffbbb"
| 26 || March 30 || Georgia || Cliff Hagan Stadium || 6-7 || Boling (2-3) || Grundy (5-2) || Cole (1) || 2,233 || 20–6 || 5–3
|- bgcolor="#ccffcc"
| 27 || March 31 || Georgia || Cliff Hagan Stadium || 5-0 || Littrell (4-0) || Benzor (1-2) || none || 1,604 || 21–6 || 6–3
|-

|- bgcolor="#ccffcc"
| 28 || April 2 || @Louisville || Jim Patterson Stadium || 5-410 || Gott (4-0) || Burdi (1-1) || none || 4,733 || 22–6 || 6–3
|- align="center" bgcolor="#ffbbb"
| 29 || April 5 || @LSU || Alex Box Stadium || 1-11 || Nola (5-0) || Reed (2-4) || none || 10,886 || 22–7 || 6–4
|- align="center" bgcolor="#ffbbb"
| 30 || April 6 || @LSU || Alex Box Stadium || 1-9 || Eades (7-0) || Grundy (5-3) || none || 11,608 || 22–8 || 6–5
|- align="center" bgcolor="#ffbbb"
| 31 || April 7 || @LSU || Alex Box Stadium || 4-11 || Glenn (5-1) || Littrell (4-1) || none || 10,971 || 22–9 || 6–6
|- bgcolor="#ccffcc"
| 32 || April 9 ||  || Cliff Hagan Stadium || 6-3 || Cody (3-1) || Hall (3-2) || Gott (8) || 1,803 || 23–9 || 6–6
|- bgcolor="#ccffcc"
| 33 || April 12 ||  || Cliff Hagan Stadium || 5-4 || Shepherd (2-0) || Saberhagen (0-2) || Gott (9) || 2,049 || 24–9 || 7–6
|- align="center" bgcolor="#ffbbb"
| 34 || April 13 || Tennessee || Cliff Hagan Stadium || 9-10 || Williams (2-2) || Grundy (5-3) || Moberg (1) || 2,726 || 24–10 || 7–7
|- align="center" bgcolor="#ffbbb"
| 35 || April 14 || Tennessee || Cliff Hagan Stadium || 0-5 || Godley (3-4) || Littrell (4-2) || none || 2,162 || 24–11 || 7–8
|- align="center" bgcolor="#ffbbb"
| 36 || April 16 || Louisville || Cliff Hagan Stadium || 5-12 || Ege (3-1) || Cody (3-2) || none || 3,589 || 24–12 || 7–8
|- align="center" bgcolor="#ffbbb"
| 37 || April 20 || @South Carolina || Carolina Stadium || 2-5  || Belcher (6-3) || Reed (2-5) || Westmoreland (3) || 7,411 || 24–13 || 7–9
|- align="center" bgcolor="#ffbbb"
| 38 || April 20 || @South Carolina || Carolina Stadium || 6-711 || Webb (2-1) || Gott (4-1) || none || 8,148 || 24–14 || 7–10
|- align="center" bgcolor="#ffbbb"
| 39 || April 21 || @South Carolina || Carolina Stadium || 1-3 || Wynkoop (5-2) || Littrell (4-3) || Webb (12) || 8,024 || 24–15 || 7–11
|- align="center" bgcolor="#ffbbb"
| 40 || April 23 || @ || Nick Denes Field || 3-218 || Pearson (2-0) || Strecker (1-1) || none || 3,571 || 24–16 || 7–11
|- bgcolor="#ccffcc"
| 41 || April 25 || @ || Swayze Field || 3-2 || Shepherd (3-0) || Greenwood (3-2) || none || 7,898  || 25–16 || 8–11
|- align="center" bgcolor="#ffbbb"
| 42 || April 26 || @Ole Miss || Swayze Field || 5-11 || Mayers (3-5) || Grundy (5-5) || none || 7,676 || 25–17 || 8–12
|- bgcolor="#ccffcc"
| 43 || April 27 || @Ole Miss || Swayze Field || 5-4 || Littrell (5-3) || Denny (1-1) || Gott (10) || 9,032 || 26–17 || 9–12
|-

|- align="center" bgcolor="#ffbbb"
| 44 || May 3 || Arkansas || Cliff Hagan Stadium || 1-2 || Astin (4-2) || Reed (2-6) || Suggs (9) || 2,336 || 26–18 || 9–13
|- align="center" bgcolor="#ffbbb"
| 45 || May 4 || Arkansas || Cliff Hagan Stadium || 3-5 || Stanek (6-2) || Littrell (5-4) || Suggs (10) || 1,794 || 26–19 || 9–14
|- bgcolor="#ccffcc"
| 46 || May 4 || Arkansas || Cliff Hagan Stadium || 4-3 || Shepherd (4-0) || Simpson (1-1) || none || 1,794 || 27–19 || 10–14
|- bgcolor="#ccffcc"
| 47 || May 7 || || Cliff Hagan Stadium || 4-1 || Grundy (6-5) || Kopilchack (1-1) || Gott (11) || 1,575 || 28–19 || 10–14
|- align="center" bgcolor="#ffbbb"
| 48 || May 11 || Vanderbilt || Cliff Hagan Stadium || 3-11 || Ziomek (10-2) || Reed (2-7) || Buehler (1) || || 28–20 || 10–15
|- align="center" bgcolor="#ffbbb"
| 49 || May 11 || Vanderbilt || Cliff Hagan Stadium || 3-5 || Beede (13-0) ||  Cody (3-3) || Miller (1) || 2,529 || 28–21 || 10–16
|- align="center" bgcolor="#ffbbb"
| 50 || May 12 || Vanderbilt || Cliff Hagan Stadium || 5-10 || Rice (3-0) || Littrell (5-5) || none || 1,961 || 28–22 || 10–17
|- bgcolor="#ccffcc"
| 51 || May 14 || Indiana || Cliff Hagan Stadium || 5-3 || Shepherd (5-0) || Harrison (4-2) || Gott (12) || 2,046 || 29–22 || 10–17
|- align="center" bgcolor="#ffbbb"
| 52 || May 16 || @Missouri || Taylor Stadium || 2-4 || Graves (2-5) || Reed (2-8) || Steele (1) || 654 || 29–23 || 10–18
|- align="center" bgcolor="#ffbbb"
| 53 || May 17 || @Missouri || Taylor Stadium || 4-3 || Walsh (2-1) || Wijas (2-1) || Steele (2) || 850 || 29–24 || 10–19
|- bgcolor="#ccffcc"
| 54 || May 18 || @Missouri || Taylor Stadium || 5-1 || Littrell (6-5) || Miles (0-3) || none || 886 || 30–24 || 11–19
|- align="center" bgcolor="#ffbbb"

|-
! style="background:#273BE2;color:white;"| Post-Season
|-

|- align="center" bgcolor="#ffbbb"
| 55 || May 21 ||  || Regions Park || 1-4 || Mayers (5-5) || Grundy (6-6) || Bailey (4) ||  || 30–25 || 0–1
|-

|-
| style="font-size:88%" | 2013 Kentucky Wildcats Baseball Schedule

See also
Kentucky Wildcats baseball

References

External links
 Kentucky Baseball official website

Kentucky Wildcats
Kentucky Wildcats baseball seasons
Kentucky Wild